Lithuania, as an EU member state, joined the eurozone by adopting the euro on 1 January 2015. This made it the last of the three Baltic states to adopt the euro, after Estonia (2011) and Latvia (2014). Before then, its currency, the litas, was pegged to the euro at 3.4528 litas to 1 euro.

History
All members of the European Union, except Denmark, are required by treaty to join the eurozone once certain economic criteria have been met. The Lithuanian litas participated in ERM II since 28 June 2004, and was pegged to the euro at a rate of 3.45280 litai = €1. Lithuania originally set 1 January 2007 as its target date for adopting the euro, and in March 2006 requested that the European Commission and the European Central Bank conduct an assessment on their readiness to adopt the currency. The Commission's report found that while Lithuania met four of the five criteria, their average annual inflation was 2.7%, exceeding the limit of 2.6%. As a result, the Commission concluded that "there should be no change at present to Lithuania's status as a Member State with a derogation." Lithuania is the only country initially denied approval to adopt the euro after requesting a convergence check.

In December 2006, the government approved a new convergence plan, which pushed the expected adoption date to post-2010 due to inflation. In 2007, Prime Minister Gediminas Kirkilas stated that he hoped for adoption around 2010–11. Generally high inflation, which reached a peak of 12.7% in June 2008 (well above the 4.2% limit of the time), delayed Lithuania's adoption of the euro. By the time of the 2010 European debt crisis, the expected switch-over date had been put back further, to 2014. Lithuania expressed interest in a suggestion from the IMF that countries which are not able to meet the Maastricht criteria be able to "partially adopt" the euro, using the currency but not getting a seat at the European Central Bank. Interviews with the Foreign Minister and Prime Minister in May and August 2012 respectively highlighted that Lithuania still aimed to adopt the euro, but would not set a target date until the state of the eurozone post-crisis was clear.

During the 2012 Lithuanian parliamentary election campaign, the Social Democrats were reported to prefer delaying the euro adoption, from the previous 2014 target until 1 January 2015. When the second round of the elections were concluded in October, the Social Democrats, the Labour Party and the Order and Justice won a majority and formed the new government, and the coalition parties were expected to accept the proposed delay in adoption of the euro.

When Prime Minister Algirdas Butkevičius presented his new government in December, eurozone accession as soon as possible was mentioned as one of the key priorities for the government. The Prime Minister said: "January 2015 is a feasible date. But things can also turn out, that we may try to adopt the euro together with Latvia in January 2014. Let the first quarter (of 2013) pass, and we'll give it a thought." However, in January 2013, the Prime Minister announced that the government and the Bank of Lithuania had agreed on a target date of 2015. In February 2013, the government of Lithuania approved a plan for euro adoption in 2015. Publicly, Butkevičius and Loreta Graužinienė (then Speaker of the Seimas) reaffirmed by mid-January 2014 the need for euro adoption in 2015.

According to figures from the Bank of Lithuania, Lithuania had met 4 out of the 5 criteria by October 2013, the exception being the government deficit of 3.2% of GDP, exceeding the limit of 3.0%. The Lithuanian government expected this to decline to 2.9% by the first quarter of 2014. In April 2014, the European Parliament's Committee on Economic and Monetary Affairs gave their preliminary consent for Lithuania to join the eurozone on 1 January 2015, having concluded that the country was complying with all the criteria according to economic data from the first months of 2014. Lithuania's parliament approved a euro changeover law in April 2014, and in their biennial reports released on 4 June the European Commission found that the country satisfied the convergence criteria. The European Central Bank did not reach a conclusion on whether the country was ready to join the euro area. On 16 July, the European Parliament voted in favour of Lithuania adopting the euro. On 23 July, the EU Council of Ministers approved the decision, clearing the way for Lithuania to adopt the euro on 1 January 2015.

Public opinion
A poll by Eurobarometer in April 2013 found that 41% of Lithuanians supported switching to the euro, while 55% were opposed. This was a decrease in support of 3% from a year earlier. A September 2014 Eurobarometer poll found that 49% of Lithuanians were opposed to the introduction of the euro and 47% supported it.

Opinion polling in the run-up to the adoption of the euro produced a mixed set of results. A Baltic Surveys (Baltijos Tyrimai) face-to-face interview survey for the eurosceptic Europeans United for Democracy party conducted on 14–24 November found that 49% of Lithuanians disagree with their Government's decision to introduce the euro, while 26% of Lithuanians approved (5% fully, 21% rather in favour). 57% of respondents said the Government acted wrongly by introducing the euro without a referendum on the issue. However, a poll conducted by Berent Research Baltic for the Bank of Lithuania between 3 and 26 November showed that 53% of the population were in favour of the new currency while 39% were sceptical.

Coin design
The designs of the Lithuanian coins share a similar national side for all denominations, featuring the Vytis symbol and the name of the country, "Lietuva". The design was announced on 11 November 2004 following a public opinion poll conducted by the Bank of Lithuania. It was created by the sculptor Antanas Žukauskas. The only difference between the coins is that the one and two euro coins have vertical lines on the outer circle, the fifty, twenty and ten cent coins have horizontal lines on the outer circle, and the five, two and one cent coins have no lines on the outer circle. In January 2014 it was announced that all coins will have "2015" printed on them to display the year of Lithuania's euro adoption. The Lithuanian Mint was chosen to produce the coins.

For the design of images on the common side and a detailed description of the coins, see euro coins.

Lithuanian Ethnographical Regions series 
Including Samogitia, Aukštaitija, Dzūkija, Suvalkija and Lithuania Minor

Accession to the eurozone
Lithuania officially joined the eurozone at midnight on the morning of 1 January 2015, with the Lithuanian Central Bank offering an exchange rate of 3.4528 LTL to one euro. Immediately after the start of the New Year, Prime Minister Butkevicius made the country's first cash withdrawal in euros. It was reported that nearly all of the nation's cash machines would be dispensing euros within 30 minutes of the New Year. In Brussels, the European Commission building was draped with a banner welcoming Lithuania to the eurozone.

The European Commission recommended in November 2014 that Lithuania extend the legally required dual price display period by six additional months, so that it would last until 31 December 2015. Lithuania did not adopt the recommendation and the required dual price display ended on 1 July 2015.

Rotation of voting rights in the ECB Governing Council
On 17 June 2014 the Deutsche Bundesbank released a statement stating that "Lithuania could cause the ECB Governing Council's voting rights to rotate. The virtually certain introduction of the euro in this small Baltic nation at the beginning of next year would cause the number of national central bank (NCB) governors on the ECB Governing Council to exceed 18 for the first time. It would trigger a changed voting procedure designed to ensure that decisions can still be taken effectively in a growing Eurosystem. This would pave the way for the introduction of a modified voting system similar to that of the US Federal Reserve System."

See also 

 Cauliflower revolution

Notes

References

External links

Adoption of the euro in Lithuania
EU Information about the euro in Lithuania

Euro coins by issuing country
Euro Coins
Euro by country
Euro